The Department is a satirical comedy on BBC Radio 4 about a secret organisation with the power to influence every aspect of your life.

Chris Addison, John Oliver and Andy Zaltzman star as Research Team 32, an eccentric three-man think-tank with the brief to brainstorm new ideas on solving society's problems.  The Department is written and performed by Chris Addison, John Oliver and Andy Zaltzman (cancelled after the third series which was written only by Oliver and Zaltzman, after Addison concentrated on his first book), with Peter Dickson, Matthew Holness and Lucy Montgomery.

Character List

Oscar Proud (Chris Addison) - Team 32's team leader and historian. Very patriotic and nostalgic for the time of the British Empire, but generally moral.
Victor Gooch (John Oliver) - Team 32's lawyer. Ruthless and cheerfully amoral.
Lazlo Wolfe (Andy Zaltzman) - Team 32's scientist. Deeply in love with 'Wendy'.
Keith Bilk (Matthew Holness) - Undersecretary to the Department Committee. Very organised, fit, talented and obnoxious. Despises Team 32.
"Tony" - A Department canteen worker, although also seen working in security. Also despises Team 32, especially Victor.

Episode list

Series One

Series Two

Series Three

References

External links
 The Department

BBC Radio comedy programmes